Luka Lozina (born 6 January 1995) is a Croatian professional water polo player. He is currently playing for VK Jug. He is 6 ft 7 in (2.00 m) tall and weighs 249 lb (113 kg).

References

1995 births
Living people
Croatian male water polo players
Water polo players from Split, Croatia